The following highways are numbered 986:

Canada

United States